Dada Chan (born 22 March 1989) is a Hong Kong actress and model under Jacso Entertainment based in Hong Kong.

Entertainment career
In 2007, as a model, she was with Hong Kong singer Jason Chan shooting Tao-Ti green tea (道地百果园饮品) advertising. In 2010, she was together with Liz and Ayu shooting a Photo Album First Impression.

Followed by her increasing popularity, Dada began her acting career. In April 2011, she was in cooperation with her ex-boyfriend Gregory Wong starred in movie Lan Kwai Fong, In this film they played as a couple. She participated in the first domestic adult comedy movie Chase Our Love.

In 2012, she was in collaboration with Chapman To and Ronald Cheng performance Pang Ho Cheung movie Vulgaria and she won “Best Supporting Actress”; in 32nd Hong Kong Film Awards with the 30 million box office hit Vulgaria, which was also nominated for Best Supporting Actress in 49th Golden Horse Film Festival and Awards. In July, she participated in micro film 宅幸福, in film as the female lead.

Dada was the only Hong Kong representative selected for the Tokyo Girls Award A/W 2011 and Tokyo Girls Collection S/S 2012.

Filmography

Film

Awards and nominations 
2010 – Face Magazine BSX Trendy Girls
2010 – Face Magazine Hot Face
2010 – HIM Magazine Hottest of The Year
2010 – China P+ New Face
2010 – Moko! Top 50 New Face
2010 – HIM Magazine Hottest of The Year
2012 – U.S TC Candler Top 100 Beautiful Face - Rank 44th

Advertisement
Spokesperson
2010 : 36 online game – HK & Taiwan
2011 : Luvinia onlinegame – HK
2011 : ASANA WELLNESS Water2
2011 : Spa Collection – HK
2012 : Spa Collection – HK & Guangzhou
2013 : Spa Collection – HK & Guangzhou
2013 : Tao Ti Watermelon Juice

CM
Hershey's
FREE&FREE
Sony T2
Biotherm
HK Yan Oi Hospital
HK Jockey Club
Vision Pro
Tao Ti
Standard Chartered Bank
Carlsberg x Neway
ASANA WELLNESS Water2
Spa Collection
Neway
Pakme Fashion
Takayama
Egawa Sushi
Federal Restaurant

Publication
2010 i-phone apps Bijin-tokei
Debut portrait album <First Impression>
2011 Calendar <Everyday With You>
2011 debut solo portrait album <Motion>
2012 debut diary <Dada Secret>

Others
Voice for E-book <Love Education Underground>
Tokyo Girls Award A/W 2011
Tokyo Girls Collection S/S 2012
2012 Debut Single <Believe in Love>

References

External links

Dada's Official Weibo Blog

1989 births
Living people
Hong Kong film actresses
21st-century Hong Kong actresses